Talamello is a comune (municipality) in the Province of Rimini in the Italian region Emilia-Romagna, located about  southeast of Bologna and about  south of Rimini.

Geography
Talamello borders the following municipalities: Maiolo, Mercato Saraceno, Novafeltria, Sogliano al Rubicone.

History 
After the referendum of 17 and 18 December 2006, Talamello was detached from the Province of Pesaro and Urbino (Marche) to join Emilia-Romagna and the Province of Rimini on 15 August 2009.

References

Cities and towns in Emilia-Romagna